Asthena opedogramma is a moth in the family Geometridae first described by Louis Beethoven Prout in 1926. It is found in Myanmar and China.

References

Moths described in 1926
Asthena
Moths of Asia